Nausinoe ejectata is a moth in the family Crambidae. It was described by Johan Christian Fabricius in 1775. It is found in India.

References

Moths described in 1775
Spilomelinae
Taxa named by Johan Christian Fabricius